The Gold Coast alphabet also Gold Coast language was a Latin alphabet used to write the Akan language during the Gold Coast era, now Ghana. It differed from the current Akan alphabet in several ways, of which the most fundamental was in vowel notation.

Vowels
In the Gold Coast script, the non- vowels were written with the five vowels of the Latin script, a e i o u, and the  vowels by adding a subscript dot to these. (The  vowels have a hollow sound to them, whereas the non- vowels sound rather like the lax vowels of English.) In modern Akan, seven vowel letters are used, with two of them being ambiguous. In addition, the Gold Coast script used a tilde to mark nasal vowels, which are not marked in modern Akan. 

* The allophone of  produced by vowel harmony with  vowels is not itself  in Asante dialect, but nonetheless is markedly distinct from the  allophone. (See International Phonetic Alphabet for an explanation of the symbols in the first two columns.)

References
The Akan (Twi-Fante) Language: Its Sound Systems and Tonal Structure. Florence Abena Dolphyne, Ghana Universities Press, Accra, 1988. 

Latin alphabets
Akan language
Gold Coast (British colony)
Ghanaian culture